Duplicariella is a genus of fungi within the Rhytismataceae family. This is a monotypic genus, containing the single species Duplicariella phyllodoces.

References

External links
Index Fungorum

Leotiomycetes
Monotypic Leotiomycetes genera